Sabah Theological Seminary (STS) is an interdenominational Protestant seminary located in the town of Kota Kinabalu, Sabah, East Malaysia. Established in 1988, STS is accredited by the Association for Theological Education in South East Asia (ATESEA) and a participating school of the South East Asia Graduate School of Theology (SEAGST) from which the Master of Theology degree is awarded.

History
STS is a Christian college established in East Malaysia in 1988 to train pastors, church workers, and lay Christians. STS is located on a 10-acre site on Signal Hill adjacent to the centre of the city of Kota Kinabalu. The facilities include an administration and teaching block, a chapel, lecturer’s apartments, student hostels, and a computerized library. A wide range of academic and practical courses are offered in Bahasa Malaysia, Mandarin and English. The degree and M.Th. programmes are accredited by ATESEA. The seminary is interdenominational and is supported by a broad base of churches both in Malaysia and abroad.

Members of The Board Governors

 Anglican Church of Sabah
 Anglican Church of Sarawak
 Basel Christian Church of Malaysia (BCCM)
 Evangelical Lutheran Church in Malaysia (ELCM)
 Grace Chapel of Sabah
 Lutheran Church of Malaysia & Singapore (LCMS)
 Protestant Church in Sabah (PCS)
 Sabah Evangelical Mission (SEM)
 Sidang Injil Borneo (SIB)
 Sabah Methodist Church

Programme

Postgraduate

 Master of Theology (Th.M.)
 Master of Ministry (M.Min.)

Graduate

 Master of Divinity (M.Div.)
 Master of Theological Studies (MTS) (English Medium)

Undergraduate

 Bachelor of Divinity (BD)
 Bachelor of Theology (Th.B.) 
 Diploma of Theology (DipTh)
 Diploma/Certificate in Pastoral Counseling (Dip.PC/CPC) (Chinese Medium)
 Certificate of Theological Studies (CTS)

Others

 Certificate in Christian Social Concern (CCSC) 
 Certificate in Christian Counseling (CCC)
 Short Term Mission Training
 Certificate of Church Ministry (CCM)
 Diploma in Church Ministry (DipCM)
 Family Ministry General Certificate
 Certificate of attendance for senior citizens

Affiliations
 Association for Theological Education in South East Asia
 South East Asia Graduate School of Theology

References

Seminaries and theological colleges in Malaysia
Protestantism in Malaysia